Rolf Müller (Essen, 31 December 1943 – Frankfurt am Main, 22 December 1999) known as Benny Quick, was a German pop and Schlager singer of the 1960s and 1970s.

References

1943 births
1999 deaths
20th-century German male singers